Leandro Moreira dos Santos, commonly known as Leandro Santos is a Brazilian footballer who plays as a goalkeeper for Treze.

Career
Born in Rondonópolis, Leandro Santos joined Portuguesa at the age of sixteen. He made his professional debut in the 2006 Campeonato Brasileiro Série B season opener against São Raimundo-AM on 15 April 2006. During his career with Portuguesa he was loaned to Coruripe and Monte Azul, being one of the highlights of the team who won promotion to the top division of São Paulo state football at the latter.

In July 2009, he joined São Caetano, where he again competed in Série B. In the final year of his contract he had loan spells at Monte Azul for a second time, and Mirassol, where he would represent the club in 2012 Campeonato Brasileiro Série D.

In September 2013, he signed an agreement to play in the 2013 Campeonato Paulista with Linense. He was one of four player signed by Bragantino from Linense in mid-2013, agreeing a one-year deal to play in 2013 Campeonato Brasileiro Série B and 2014 Campeonato Paulista. He stayed with the club for the 2014 Campeonato Brasileiro Série B, but suffered injury and lost his place, signing in June 2014 with Penapolense to play in Série D.

Leandro Santos played 2015 Campeonato Brasileiro Série B and 2016 Campeonato Paulista with Oeste, before signing with Guarani in April 2016. He secured promotion with the club from Série C, and signed up for the 2017 season.

From 2018 to 2020, Leandro Santos played in the lower division of Paulista football, firstly returning to Portuguesa, then with Comercial and Desportivo Brasil.

In January 2021, Leandro Santos signed for Treze.

References

External links
 

Living people
1984 births
Brazilian footballers
Association football goalkeepers
Associação Portuguesa de Desportos players
Associação Atlética Coruripe players
Associação Desportiva São Caetano players
Atlético Monte Azul players
Mirassol Futebol Clube players
Clube Atlético Linense players
Clube Atlético Bragantino players
Clube Atlético Penapolense players
Oeste Futebol Clube players
Guarani FC players
Comercial Futebol Clube (Ribeirão Preto) players
Desportivo Brasil players
Treze Futebol Clube players
Campeonato Brasileiro Série B players
Campeonato Brasileiro Série C players
Campeonato Brasileiro Série D players